General elections were held in Belize on 14 December 1984. The result was a victory for the opposition United Democratic Party, which won 21 of the 28 seats. Voter turnout was 75.0%.

Background
The elections were the first in Belize since it achieved full independence from the United Kingdom in 1981. In its more than 30 years of existence, the ruling People's United Party had never lost an election at the national level, whilst the opposition had never won more than six seats (out of a possible eighteen in 1974). However, by 1984 the PUP were presiding over an economy in recession and that had just recently been bailed out by the IMF. The party was internally fractured and faced a United Democratic Party that had made significant gains since losing the last general election in 1979. Senator Manuel Esquivel – who Prime Minister George Price defeated in his own House constituency in 1979 – became UDP leader in December 1983.

The ongoing border dispute with Guatemala was also a campaign issue, with the UDP criticising Price's negotiations.  The UDP advocated for foreign direct investment to help reduce the unemployment rate.

Just a few months before the election, Price ordered a redistricting of electoral boundaries. This created 10 new constituencies for a total of 28, but the majority were upset because of claims that the PUP drew the boundaries with victory in mind. Esquivel was elected in the newly created Caribbean Shores House constituency, while Price himself was defeated in his Freetown constituency after over 30 years of continuous service in the House of Representatives and its predecessors. Esquivel succeeded Price as prime minister to become the first non-PUP leader in the nation's history. Price continued to lead the PUP from outside the National Assembly while Florencio Marin became Leader of the Opposition.

Results

References

Belize
Legislative election
General elections in Belize
Belize